Perotrochus amabilis, common name the lovely slit shell, is a species of sea snail, a marine gastropod mollusk in the family Pleurotomariidae.

Description
The length of the shell varies between 50 mm and 93 mm.

Distribution
This marine species occurs in the Gulf of Mexico, the Caribbean Sea; in the Atlantic Ocean from Florida to Brazil.

References

External links
 

Pleurotomariidae
Gastropods described in 1963